The East–West Line (EWL) is a high-capacity Mass Rapid Transit (MRT) line operated by SMRT in Singapore, running from Pasir Ris station in the east to Tuas Link station in the west, with an additional branch between Changi Airport and Tanah Merah stations. It is the second Mass Rapid Transit line to be built in Singapore. The  line is the longest on the MRT network (this title will be given to the Cross Island line upon its complete opening by the 2040s), with 35 stations, 8 of which (from Lavender to Tiong Bahru and Changi Airport stations) are underground. The line is coloured green on the rail map.

Constructed and opened as part of the North South line (NSL) in the early stages of development, the East West line was formed after the opening of the eastern extension to Tanah Merah in 1989. Nevertheless, both lines used identical signalling equipment and rolling stock. The East West Line signalling systems have been upgraded along with the North South Line and is the second line to have its signalling upgraded completely, converting it from semi-automatic to fully automated operations.

History
The first segment of what would become the East West line, between City Hall to Outram Park stations, was opened on 12 December 1987 as part of the North South line. It was extended westwards to Clementi station on 12 March 1988. During the construction of the extension to Clementi station, Commonwealth Avenue West was realigned to accommodate the viaduct. The line was later extended to Lakeside on 5 November 1988. The  eastern extension to Tanah Merah station opened on 4 November 1989, and the opening ceremony was attended by then First Deputy Prime Minister Goh Chok Tong.  At that point, the East West line was formed, reflecting the operational split from the North South line which has at the same time extended to Marina Bay station, and uses a green coloured theme.

The  line extension to Pasir Ris station was opened ahead of schedule on 16 December 1989 with a sneak preview beforehand. Boon Lay station opened on 6 July 1990, marking the completion of the initial MRT system.

Subsequent developments

Dover station

Construction on a new infill station Dover station between Buona Vista station and Clementi station began in June 1998. The building of the station was met with reservations by some members of the public over the small area it serviced and there were criticisms over the spending of "taxpayers' money" chiefly for use only by students of one educational institution. Despite some opposition, the Land Transport Authority proceeded with the construction to serve commuters along Singapore Polytechnic with Dover housing estate. On 18 October 2001, Dover was opened. Prior to opening, test runs were conducted from 13 to 17 October 2001 when the trains stopped at this station but did not open their doors. Dover is the first station in the MRT network to be built as an infill station.

Tanah Merah to Airport extension line

The idea of extending the Mass Rapid Transit system to Changi Airport was reconsidered when Terminal 3 of the airport was being built. Earlier plans had long been made for a new line branching off from the existing East West line at Tanah Merah, with some conceptual plans showing a tentative route alignment up to the airport along Airport Boulevard, continuing beyond the airport to Changi Point, before turning southwest back towards the city along the eastern coasts. The plans were finally announced by then Deputy Prime Minister Lee Hsien Loong on 15 November 1996. However, the new route alignment showed a deviation from previous plans, where the final plan involved in building only the first two stations of Expo, and Changi Airport, the latter being the underground station built between Terminal 2 and Terminal 3. The alignment of the station at the airport also switched perpendicularly to an east–west direction, such that the station leads to two of the terminals directly from either end of the station. The station's designs were unveiled on 10 February 1998 with construction starting on 29 January 1999. Expo and Changi Airport were opened on 10 January 2001 and 8 February 2002 respectively and operates under a shuttle service. Prior to 22 July 2003, train services from Boon Lay commences after the opening, but were later reverted to shuttle services due to low patronage. On 25 May 2019, it was announced that the Changi Airport Extension will be converted to become part of Thomson-East Coast line Extension (TELe) by 2040.

Boon Lay and Tuas extension

The  Boon Lay extension was first announced by the LTA on 29 December 2004, set to serve residents from the Jurong West Town area and those working in the Jurong Industrial Estate. The two stations, Pioneer and Joo Koon stations, officially opened on 28 February 2009.

On 11 January 2011, the Tuas West extension, an extension of the East West line from Joo Koon to Tuas Link was announced. The viaduct is integrated with part of a  road viaduct along Pioneer Road, which will increase the road capacity to cope with anticipated increase in traffic. The stations are Gul Circle, Tuas Crescent, Tuas West Road, and Tuas Link. On 4 May 2012, the Land Transport Authority marked the start of construction of the Tuas West extension with a groundbreaking ceremony at the site of the future Tuas Link station.

The extension began service on 18 June 2017. During initial stages after opening, the westbound trains will alternate their terminus between Joo Koon and Tuas Link, where for every two trains, one train will terminate at the former, while the other train will terminate at the latter.

Additional platform at Tanah Merah station
On 25 August 2014, the Land Transport Authority announced that a new platform will be constructed at Tanah Merah, enabling faster travel and shorter waiting times for commuters heading towards Expo and Changi Airport on the Changi Airport branch line of the East West line.

On 26 October 2016, the Land Transport Authority awarded the civil contract to Lum Chang Building Contractors Pte. Ltd. to build a new platform at Tanah Merah and viaducts for a contract sum of S$325 million. In addition to the new platforms, the existing East West line tracks will be extended to connect the line to the new four-in-one East Coast Integrated Depot at Changi. When completed in 2024, it will be the second station to have triple island platforms after Jurong East.

Half-height platform screen door installations
There were calls for platform screen doors (PSDs) to be installed at above-ground stations after several incidents in which passengers were killed or seriously injured by oncoming trains when they fell onto the railway tracks at above-ground stations. Underground stations already featured the doors since 1987. The authorities initially rejected the proposal by casting doubts over functionality and concerns about the high installation costs, but made an about-turn later with the government announcing plans to install half-height platform screen doors on the elevated stations on 25 January 2008, citing lower costs due to it becoming a more common feature worldwide. They were first installed at Jurong East, Pasir Ris, and Yishun stations in 2009 as trial runs. On 31 August 2011, the LTA announced completion of the installation of PSDs along the East West line, with Expo being the last station on the line to receive the PSDs. Installation of PSDs across both the North South and East West lines (NSEWL) were completed on 14 March 2012, 3 months ahead of schedule.

Improvement works

Timber to concrete sleeper replacement works
The timber sleepers on the East West line was required to be replaced as they were near the end of their 25-year lifespan. The replacement sleepers, made of concrete, have a significantly longer lifespan. To speed up works, train services on the East West line was adjusted to end earlier. The work was divided into three phases: Phase 1 (Bugis – Tanah Merah), Phase 2 (Joo Koon – Jurong East, Tanah Merah – Pasir Ris) and Phase 3 (Jurong East – Outram Park). The sleepers were fully replaced on 18 February 2017.

Re-signalling works
A new moving-block signalling system, supplied by Thales, replaced the former ageing fixed-block signalling system on the East West line. The new signalling system, costing $195 million, reduces waiting times for trains during peak periods from 120 seconds then to 100 seconds now. The new system became operational between Pioneer and Tuas Link stations on 18 June 2017. Newer rolling stocks, such as the C151B and C151C, are equipped for use solely on the new signalling system. Since 27 May 2018, the new signalling system has been operating full-day on the entire East West line.

Third-rail replacement
Replacement works on the third rail, which provides electricity to the trains, were carried out between September 2015 and August 2017. The new third rail replaced its 30-year-old predecessor and is expected to increase reliability of the East West line's electrical system.

Pasir Ris turnback extension 
Work to extend the turnback at the eastern terminus of the line, Pasir Ris, commenced in 2019. The work will allow an increase in service frequency at peak times from 30 to 36 trains per hour.

Incidents

1993 Clementi train collision

On 5 August 1993, before opening, a maintenance vehicle spilt oil on the tracks between Clementi and Jurong East. The first ten eastbound trains reported braking problems, then the eleventh train from Jurong stopped at the Clementi station for two minutes longer than scheduled due to it using its emergency brakes to stop at the station at 7.50 am, before being hit by another eastbound train when it failed to stop in time. 156 passengers were injured by the collision.

7 July 2015 power trip
During the evening peak hours on 7 July 2015, train services on the East West and North South lines were temporarily disrupted due to massive power trips detected along both lines. The cause of the disruption was due to damaged insulators which had resulted in the failure of the power supply. For this disruption that brought inconvenience to 413,000 commuters, LTA imposed a 'record' fine of S$5.4 million on SMRT.

22 March 2016 staff fatalities

At about 11.08 am on 22 March 2016, two SMRT track-maintenance trainee staff were killed after a C151 train approaching Pasir Ris station ran over them, resulting in a temporarily service delay between Tanah Merah and Pasir Ris for about 2.5 hours and affected at least 10,000 commuters.

In a report, the two trainee staff joined SMRT in January 2016 and worked as technicians under a technical team of 15 staff led by a supervisor and were tasked to go down to the tracks to investigate an alarm triggered by a possible signalling equipment fault close by the station. An operator cited that they were granted access to the tracks, but did not coordinate with a Signal Unit in the station to ensure trains could not travel in the area where the team was.

Patrick Nathan, SMRT vice-president, promised that "SMRT will review all safety protocols particularly those involving track access". SMRT chief executive Desmond Kuek apologised for the incident and said SMRT will investigate how "the [two men] got hit by the train". SMRT fired both an engineer responsible for leading with the team and the train driver who was involved at the scene of the accident.

On 2 December 2016, SMRT was formally accused of failing to ensure that its employees complied with approved operating procedures when accessing the track; SMRT was then pleaded guilty to its charges on 28 February 2017 and incurred a S$400,000 fine. Investigations are still ongoing against the two men, Teo Wee Kiat (SMRT's director of control operations) and Lim Say Heng, both charged for the incident.

15 November 2017 train collision and delays

A second train collision occurred on 15 November 2017 at approximately 8.18am, where two C151A trains collided at Joo Koon MRT station. A train fault caused the first train heading in the direction of Tuas Link to stall at the station. A minute later, a second train stopped behind the first and then "moved forward unexpectedly" to cause the collision. 38 people, which include two SMRT staff were hospitalized.

Train services between Tuas Link and Joo Koon stations were temporally suspended on both directions for two hours on the day itself and the entire day on 16 November 2017, resulting that the westbound trains would temporarily terminate at Joo Koon.

An update by the Land Transport Authority (LTA) & SMRT on 16 November 2017 stated that LTA and SMRT have decided to isolate for up to one month the operations of the Tuas West extension, which runs on the new signalling system, from the rest of the East West line, which runs on the old signalling system, enabling LTA engineers to carry out further assurance checks together with Thales. The train was switching systems when the collision took place. Train service on the line resumed on 20 November, with the Tuas West extension between Gul Circle and Tuas Link using the new signalling system and the section between Pasir Ris and Joo Koon, together with the Changi Airport Branch continuing to run on the old signalling system. Train services between Joo Koon and Gul Circle were temporarily suspended until its resumption on 28 May 2018; between the suspension a free bridging bus service is available between the two stations. Continuous service between Pasir Ris and Gul Circle resumed on 28 May 2018, with the permanent activation of the new CBTC system; since the incident, selected portions of either North South or East West line were closed to conduct track renewal works with early weekend closures and later station openings.

Network and operations

Route

As its name implies, the East West line connects central Singapore to both eastern and western parts of the island, with an additional branch between Changi Airport and Tanah Merah, which operates as a separate shuttle service. It is 57.2 kilometers (35.5 miles) long and it is predominantly double-tracked, but certain short sections at Tanah Merah, Outram Park and Joo Koon widens to three tracks, four tracks nearby Jurong East station and a section between Jurong East and Clementi station and five tracks nearby Changi Depot and Tanah Merah station. 

Some stations are commonly placed at the middle of the roads such as Tanah Merah, Bedok, Queenstown, Commonwealth, Dover, Clementi, Pioneer, Joo Koon, Gul Circle, Tuas Crescent and Tuas West Road. The line runs mostly on overhead viaducts but goes underground in the city area between Kallang and Redhill, Bedok and Kembangan, and between Expo and Changi Airport. Travelling from one end of the line to the other takes about 85 minutes.

The line begins above ground at Pasir Ris station from where it continues to head south towards Simei station. The line curves between Simei to Tanah Merah stations and continues westwards, joining the Changi Airport branch, paralleling New Upper Changi Road. Two branch lines to Changi Depot and to Changi Airport station exists between Simei and Tanah Merah stations. At Tanah Merah station, the line extends to four tracks due to its interchange with the Changi branch before turning back into two tracks in a western direction.

From Bedok station and Kembangan stations, the line goes underground but then goes above-ground, and follows the route of Sims Avenue and Sims Avenue East in an opposite direction. After Kallang station, the line goes underground through the Central Area and runs heads south-west towards City Hall station. It then runs parallel to the North South line between City Hall and Raffles Place stations, which are cross-platform interchanges to the North South line. After Tanjong Pagar, the line curves northwestwards towards Outram Park. After Tiong Bahru, the line continues above ground starting with Redhill station and follows the direction of Commonwealth Avenue, Commonwealth Avenue West and Boon Lay Way. Between Clementi and Jurong East station, three branches (one going east and two going west) to Ulu Pandan Depot are deployed. At Jurong East station, the line extends again to four tracks due to its interchange with the North-South line but then, separates into two before heading west to Chinese Garden station. After Pioneer station, the line heads south-west before curving westwards towards Joo Koon station. The line terminates at Tuas Link with a branch heading towards Tuas Depot.

The Changi Airport extension starts at Tanah Merah station as a single track before turning eastwards to Expo station. After Expo station, it goes underground and curves south before terminating at Changi Airport station.

The East West line was constructed along the North South line. As such, both lines used identical signalling equipment and rolling stock.

Stations
The line serves 35 stations across  of track, and station codes for the line are green, corresponding to the line's colour on the system map. 8 stations, including Changi Airport, and 7 other stations on the stretch from Lavender to Tiong Bahru are underground, with the rest being elevated. With the exception of Dover, all stations have island platforms.

Legend

List

SMRT used to operate the branch sector of Tanah Merah to Changi Airport as a through service from Boon Lay from 18 November 2001 until 22 July 2003, when it was replaced with a shuttle service. By 2040, the Changi Airport line (CAL) will be converted to the Thomson-East Coast line.

Depots

Infrastructure

Rolling stock

Five batches of rolling stock operate on the East West Line, namely the C151, C651, C751B, C151A and C151B from oldest to newest, which are also operated on the North South Line. Trains are maintained at Ulu Pandan Depot, Changi Depot and Tuas Depot, which provides train maintenance, inspection and overhaul facilities. These models of rolling stock were introduced to boost the capacity on both the North South and the East West lines in order to cope with increasing ridership.

Both the North South and the East West lines utilized identical rolling stock up until the recent years, when the C151A trains was temporary suspended from operating on the North South Line from January 2012 until November 2013 following the 2011 Train Disruptions. The C151B trains, which was introduced in April 2017, did not begin revenue service on the full-stretch of the East West Line until the line's trial of the CBTC signalling system in May 2018. The C151C trains, despite its introduction on 30 September 2018, is not operating on the East West Line.

Another generation of rolling stock, the R151 trains, will be delivered from 2022 to 2026, to replace all 66 first-generation C151, all 19 second-generation C651 and all 21 third-generation C751B trains which will be retired. The R151 trains will be the first rolling stock on the East West Line to be manufactured by Bombardier (Bought by Alstom in 2021), which has also supplied trains for the Downtown Line.

Train control

The East West line is equipped with Thales SelTrac communications-based train control (CBTC) moving block signalling system with automatic train control (ATC) under automatic train operation (ATO) GoA 3 (DTO). The subsystems consist of automatic train protection (ATP) to govern train speed, NetTrac MT Automatic Train Supervision (ATS) to track and schedule trains and a computer-based interlocking (CBI) system that prevents incorrect signal and track points to be set.

The old signalling system has undergone decommissioning work from August 2018 and was completed on 23 November 2018.  It consists of Westinghouse fixed block signalling system with Automatic train control (ATC) under Automatic train operation (ATO) GoA 2 (STO). The subsystems consist of Automatic train protection (ATP) to govern train speed, Automatic Train Supervision (ATS) to track and schedule trains and a Relay interlocking system that prevents incorrect signal and track points to be set.

The stretch of track between Pioneer and Tuas Link stations was equipped with the new signalling system which came into use in June 2017. As the section of track between Pioneer and Joo Koon support 'mixed-mode' of both signalling systems, trains terminating at either Joo Koon or Tuas Link would have to change signalling modes at Pioneer MRT station as trains terminating at Joo Koon would proceed to a turn back siding which was built as part of the TWE which only supports the new signalling system. Eastbound trains towards Pasir Ris would have to change back to the old signalling system at Pioneer MRT station. This procedure was removed after the train collision at Joo Koon as trains terminated at Joo Koon. The new signalling system became fully operational on 28 May 2018.

Automatic full-height platform screen doors by Westinghouse were originally installed in all underground stations since opening, and half-height platform screen doors by ST Engineering's Electronics sector were installed by August 2011 on elevated stations. Tuas West extension stations have half-height platform screen doors, manufactured by Fangda.

In popular culture
The line's Changi Branch is featured in tvN series Little Women.

References

External links

 East West Line

Mass Rapid Transit (Singapore) lines
Railway lines opened in 1987
1987 establishments in Singapore